The second season of Casamento às Cegas: Brasil, also known as Love Is Blind: Brazil premiered on Netflix on December 28, 2022, as part of a three-week event. Brazilian celebrity couple Camila Queiroz and Klebber Toledo returned for their second season as hosts.

Following the format of the American television series Love Is Blind, a group of men and women meet on the show with the hopes of finding a partner in marriage.

Production

Filming 
Filming began in São Paulo in March 2022, and lasted 39 days up until the weddings. After the five newly engaged couples left the pods, filming took place at the Mirante do Gavião Amazon Lodge in Novo Airão, about 180 km upstream of Manaus, Amazonas, Brazil, when all the couples went on a retreat. Then, the relationships that made it through the retreat move in together in an apartment complex in São Paulo, where they spent the rest of the time filming up until the weddings in May 2022.

Release 
The teaser for the second season was released on September 24, 2022, during the fourth edition of Netflix's Tudum. The season's trailer was released on November 23, 2022. With the trailer, it was announced that the ten-episode season would be released on a three-week schedule: the first four episodes were released on December 28, 2022, the next four on January 4, 2023, and the final two on January 11.

On January 11, 2023, Netflix announced a reunion special on February 1. The reunion was filmed on January 6.

Season summary

Contestants

Episodes

References 

2022 Brazilian television seasons
2023 Brazilian television seasons